Smultring (plural: smultringer) and hjortetakk (sometimes spelled hjortebakkels) are cake doughnuts from Norway. They are small and usually prepared without glazing or filling, and are often spiced with cardamom, cinnamon, lemon or orange zest, as well as various liqueurs.

Overview

Smultringer are torus-shaped and sold from trucks and, at Christmas time, from stalls. They are described as being "thick, heavy dough fried in lard that are best eaten while hot and with the grease still dripping". Smultringer are popular with expatriate Norwegians, including those in Minnesota who serve them with krumkake and riskrem (rice whipped cream), and fattigmann at Christmas dinners.

Hjortebakkels are made from rolls of dough looped with the ends overlapping. Brandy is often used as an ingredient. The Norwegian name comes from the fact that hartshorn was traditionally used as a raising agent.

See also
List of Norwegian desserts
List of doughnut varieties
List of fried dough foods
Gløgg

References

External links

Photo of a smulring truck
Smultring

Christmas food
Doughnuts
Cuisine of Minnesota
Norwegian cuisine